Cirsium hookerianum, common name Hooker's thistle or white thistle,  is a North American species of thistle native to western Canada and the northwestern United States. It is found in the northern Rocky Mountains as well as in some of the northern Cascades and Coast Ranges, in Alberta, British Columbia, Washington, Idaho, Montana, and Wyoming.

Cirsium hookerianum is biennial or perennial herb up to 150 cm (60 inches) tall, with a large taproot. Leaves are green on top, usually white and woolly underneath, with spines along the edges. There are usually several flower heads with white or pink disc florets but no ray florets. The species grows in grasslands, meadows, and the edges of forests in mountainous areas.

References 

hookerianum
Flora of North America
Plants described in 1841